Sexton (also Salem Springs) is a former community in Dutch Mills Township, Washington County, Arkansas, United States. The community was located on a tributary of the Baron Fork (a tributary of the Illinois River) approximately one-half mile east of the Arkansas - Oklahoma state line.

A post office called Sexton was established in 1882, and remained in operation until 1906. The community has the name of William H. Sexton, an early postmaster.

References

Geography of Washington County, Arkansas
Ghost towns in Arkansas
1882 establishments in Arkansas